The second season of the American competitive reality television series Top Chef VIP will premiere on Telemundo in April 2023. The season was announced on 24 September 2022. Carmen Villalobos will return as host, with Antonio de Livier, Adria Marina Montaño and Juan Manuel Barrientos returning as judges. The winner will receive US$100,000.

Contestants 
Twenty celebrities were selected to compete in Top Chef VIP. The first group of celebrities were announced on March 14, 2023.

References

External links 
 

Top Chef